Stagmatoptera is a genus consisting of 14 species of mantises in the monotypic tribe Stagmatopterini, that inhabit the Neotropical region.

Species

Stagmatoptera abdominalis
Stagmatoptera binotata
Stagmatoptera biocellata
Stagmatoptera cerdai
Stagmatoptera diana
Stagmatoptera femoralis
Stagmatoptera hyaloptera (Argentine white crested mantis )
Stagmatoptera indicator
Stagmatoptera luna
Stagmatoptera pia
Stagmatoptera praecaria
Stagmatoptera reimoseri
Stagmatoptera septentrionalis
Stagmatoptera supplicaria

See also
List of mantis genera and species

References

 
Mantodea genera
Stagmatopterinae
Taxa named by Hermann Burmeister